The Slav Epic is a cycle of 20 large canvases painted by Czech Art Nouveau painter Alphonse Mucha between 1910 and 1928. The cycle depicts the mythology and history of Czechs and other Slavic peoples. In 1928, after finishing his monumental work, Mucha bestowed the cycle upon the city of Prague on the condition that the city build a special pavilion for it.

Prior to 2012, the work was a part of the permanent exhibition at the chateau in the town of Moravský Krumlov in the South Moravian Region of the Czech Republic. In 2012, all 20 works were moved and displayed together on the ground floor of the Veletržní Palace until 2016, in an exhibition organized by the National Gallery in Prague (exhibition catalogue: Alphonse Mucha – Slovanská epopej). The works are currently on display back in the town of Moravský Krumlov.

Background 

Alphonse Mucha spent many years working on The Slav Epic cycle, which he considered his life's masterwork. He had dreamed of completing such a series, a celebration of Slavic history, since the turn of the 20th century; however, his plans were limited by financial constraints. In 1909, he managed to obtain grants by an American philanthropist and keen admirer of the Slavic culture, Charles Richard Crane. He began by visiting the places he intended to depict in the cycle: Russia, Poland, and the Balkans, including the E. Orthodox monasteries of Mount Athos. Additionally, he consulted historians regarding details of historical events in order to ensure an accurate depiction. In 1910, he rented part of the castle in Zbiroh and began working on the series.

Mucha continued working on the cycle for 18 years, gradually submitting paintings to the city of Prague as he completed them. In 1919, the first part of the series comprising eleven canvases was displayed in the Prague's Clementinum. In his opening speech, Mucha stated:
"the mission of the Epic is not completed. Let it announce to foreign friends – and even to enemies – who we were, who we are, and what we hope for. May the strength of the Slav spirit command their respect, because from respect, love is born."

In 1921, five of the paintings were shown in New York and Chicago to great public acclaim.

In 1928, the complete cycle was displayed for the first time in the Trade Fair Palace in Prague, the Czechoslovak capital.

Alphonse Mucha died in July, 1939. Shortly before his death he was interrogated by the Gestapo, as he was an important exponent of public life in Czechoslovakia. During World War II, the Slav Epic was wrapped and hidden away to prevent seizure by the Nazis.

Following the Czechoslovak coup d'état of 1948 and subsequent communist takeover of the country, Mucha was considered a decadent and bourgeois artist, estranged from the ideals of socialist realism. The building of a special pavilion for the exposition of the Slav Epic cycle became irrelevant and unimportant for the new communist regime. After the war, the paintings were moved to the chateau at Moravský Krumlov by a group of local patriots, and the cycle went on display there in 1963.

Controversy 
The city of Prague has waged a decade-long legal battle over the work which intensified in early 2010. Much consideration has been given to relocating the Slav Epic from Moravský Krumlov (where it had been displayed for almost 50 years), to Prague. The hope was that Prague, a city frequented by many thousands of tourists, would attract increased attention to the series of paintings. However, there is no suitable space for the work in Prague's galleries. Therefore, some Czech state institutions, such as the Office of the President of the Czech Republic, found it preferable to leave the paintings in their current location since there have been few problems there. Nevertheless, in early 2010, the city of Prague requested the return of the Slav Epic for restoration work and subsequent display. However, the Mucha Foundation, run by the artist's grandson John Mucha and his mother Geraldine, blocked the move as it would simply be a provisional measure. The City of Prague argued that not Alphonse Mucha but Charles R. Crane was the owner of the paintings and that he has donated the cycle to the City of Prague. According to the newspaper Mladá fronta DNES, the information was proved by contracts found in the city archives. The Foundation is in talks with the City of Prague for the construction of a permanent home for the work.

On 25 July 2010, over a thousand people gathered in Moravský Krumlov to protest the planned move of The Slav Epic from the town.

After a two-year dispute between Prague and the Moravian town of Moravský Krumlov, the renowned cycle of 20 monumental canvases was—in a move protested by conservationists and art historians alike—taken for display at the National Gallery's Veletržní Palace in 2012 and remained there until the end of 2016. In 2018, nine of the canvases of The Slav Epic were shown in Brno during the RE:PUBLIKA Festival. The exhibition combined two opposing worlds of renowned Art Nouveau artist Alphonse Mucha’s works – the majestic Slav Epic and a unique collection of posters.

The paintings were controversially taken on a two year tour of Asia, returning to Prague in 2019.

List of paintings 
The work consists of 20 paintings, up to six metres tall and eight metres wide.

See also 
 Pan-Slavism

References

Further reading 
 Dusza, Erin M. (2012). Epic Significance: Placing Alphonse Mucha's Czech Art in the Context of Pan-Slavism and Czech Nationalism. Georgia State University.

External links 

 The Slav Epic - Themes and gallery (The Mucha Foundation)
 The Slav Epic: The Magnum Opus of Alphonse Mucha (by John Price)
 Website dedicated to Slav Epic and its digitisation
 Community website sharing news, articles and individuals' opinion about Mucha and his art

Czech paintings
Pan-Slavism
1910s paintings
Art Nouveau works
History paintings
Painting series
Cultural depictions of Jan Žižka
Cultural depictions of Jan Hus